Aechmea egleriana is a plant species in the genus Aechmea. This species is native to Venezuela, French Guiana and northern Brazil.

References

egleriana
Flora of South America
Plants described in 1958